Lee Seung-woo (born 6 January 1998) is a South Korean footballer who plays as a left winger for Suwon FC.

Early life 

At age of 12, Lee caught the attention of FC Barcelona after he finished as the top scorer in the 2010 Danone Nations Cup, one of the most prestigious youth football tournaments. He joined Barcelona's youth academy, La Masia, and scored 39 goals in 29 appearances during his first season. He was also named the best player in four youth tournaments: Torneo Canillas, Memorial Gaetano Scirea, Trofeo San Bonifacio, and Gabala Cup. He was nicknamed the "Korean Messi" after showing his talent.

However, he was banned from playing in the regular season for three years until his 18th birthday by transfer regulations of FIFA. On 13 March 2016, he made his senior debut for the B team.

Club career

Verona 
On 31 August 2017, Lee joined Italian club Hellas Verona on a four-year deal, for a fee of €1.5 million. Barcelona retained the option to repurchase him until 2019 for an undisclosed fee.

On 24 September, he made his Serie A debut for Verona in the second half of the game against Lazio. On 6 May 2018, he scored his first Serie A goal in an away match against Milan, but his team lost 4–1.

Verona was relegated to the Serie B by finishing the league in 19th place. He scored one goal and provided two assists during 27 appearances in the 2018–19 Serie B. Verona was promoted to the Serie A by winning the promotion play-offs, but he was excluded from Verona's plan for the next season.

Sint-Truiden 
On 30 August 2019, Lee joined Belgian First Division A side Sint-Truiden. He was excluded from the list of the squad for twelve consecutive matches, and this situation caused much controversy in South Korea. His name was on the list for the first time against Genk on 29 November, and he made his Belgian league debut against Waasland-Beveren on 26 December. He finished his first season due to early termination of the Belgian league caused by the COVID-19 pandemic after making only four appearances.

On 13 September 2020, he scored his first and second goal for Sint-Truiden against Royal Antwerp, but his team lost 3–2 despite his two goals. However, he failed to score in six games where he played as a starter excluding a game against Antwerp, and his team also did not get a victory at the same time. When he was being excluded from the squad again, some South Korean journalists recommended playing in South Korea to him.

On 1 February 2021, Lee joined Primeira Liga side Portimonense on a six-month loan deal with an option to buy. He had difficulty in leaving special impression on the new club. He left Portimonense after the end of his contract.

Suwon FC
In December 2021 Lee returned to his hometown of Suwon, signing with K League 1 side Suwon FC on a multi-year deal.

International career 
Lee made his international debut as a part of the South Korea under-16 team in the 2014 AFC U-16 Championship qualification. He scored four goals in a qualifier against Laos.

In the 2014 AFC U-16 Championship, he showed overwhelming performances, leading South Korea to the final. He scored winning goals against Malaysia and Thailand in the group stage. Afterwards, in the quarter-finals, he scored all two goals in a 2–0 win over Japan, and left a memorable scene. He destroyed Japan's defense by dribbling for about 50 meters, scoring his second goal. In the semi-finals against Syria, he recorded one goal and four assists. He became the tournament's best player and top goalscorer, although his team lost the final to North Korea.

Lee played for South Korea in the 2015 FIFA U-17 World Cup, but he missed a crucial penalty against Belgium.
South Korea lost to Belgium in the round of 16.

Lee participated in the 2017 FIFA U-20 World Cup hosted by South Korea. He scored the winning goal and provided one assist in the first group match against Guinea. He scored the opening goal after dribbling alone for 40 meters in the second match against Argentina. South Korea was eliminated by a loss to Portugal in the round of 16.

In a friendly against Honduras just before the 2018 FIFA World Cup, Lee made his senior international debut and showed impressive performance including an assist. He was selected for the World Cup team, playing two World Cup matches as a substitute.

Lee was named in the South Korea under-23 squad for the 2018 Asian Games in Jakarta-Palembang. In the round of 16 against Iran, he scored his first goal of the tournament. In the semi-finals against Vietnam, he led South Korea to a 3–1 victory with two goals and one assist. In extra time of the final, he scored the crucial opening goal, contributing to a 2–1 victory over Japan. He won a gold medal after the final.

Career statistics

Club

International

Honours
South Korea U17
AFC U-16 Championship runner-up: 2014

South Korea U23
Asian Games: 2018

Individual
AFC U-16 Championship Most Valuable Player: 2014
AFC U-16 Championship top goalscorer: 2014
AFC Youth Player of the Year: 2017
Korean FA Goal of the Year: 2017

References

External links
Lee Seung-Woo Official Twitter
Lee Seung-woo – National Team Stats at KFA 

1998 births
Living people
People from Suwon
South Korean footballers
Association football wingers
FC Barcelona Atlètic players
Hellas Verona F.C. players
Sint-Truidense V.V. players
Portimonense S.C. players
Suwon FC players
Segunda División B players
Serie A players
Serie B players
Belgian Pro League players
South Korean expatriate footballers
Expatriate footballers in Spain
Expatriate footballers in Italy
Expatriate footballers in Belgium
Expatriate footballers in Portugal
South Korean expatriate sportspeople in Spain
South Korean expatriate sportspeople in Italy
South Korean expatriate sportspeople in Belgium
South Korean expatriate sportspeople in Portugal
South Korea international footballers
South Korea under-17 international footballers
South Korea under-20 international footballers
South Korea under-23 international footballers
2018 FIFA World Cup players
Footballers at the 2018 Asian Games
Asian Games medalists in football
Asian Games gold medalists for South Korea
Medalists at the 2018 Asian Games
2019 AFC Asian Cup players
Sportspeople from Gyeonggi Province